Aïssa Djabir Saïd-Guerni (born 29 March 1977 in Algiers) is a retired Algerian athlete who predominantly competed in the 800 metres. Saïd-Guerni competed at the 2000 Summer Olympics and 2004 Summer Olympics in the 800 metres, and was also the flag bearer for Algeria at both these games.

He announced his retirement on 6 May 2007, following injury problems. His personal best time was 1:43.09 minutes, achieved in September 1999 in Brussels.

Competition record

References

External links 

1977 births
Living people
Sportspeople from Algiers
Algerian male middle-distance runners
Olympic athletes of Algeria
Olympic bronze medalists for Algeria
Athletes (track and field) at the 2000 Summer Olympics
Athletes (track and field) at the 2004 Summer Olympics
Medalists at the 2000 Summer Olympics
World Athletics Championships athletes for Algeria
World Athletics Championships medalists
Olympic bronze medalists in athletics (track and field)
African Games silver medalists for Algeria
African Games medalists in athletics (track and field)
Mediterranean Games bronze medalists for Algeria
Athletes (track and field) at the 1997 Mediterranean Games
Mediterranean Games medalists in athletics
Athletes (track and field) at the 1999 All-Africa Games
World Athletics Championships winners
21st-century Algerian people
20th-century Algerian people